Jeanne Combs (born 1955)  is a politician from the U.S. state of Nebraska.  She represented the 32nd District in the Nebraska Legislature from 2003 to 2007.

Combs was born October 31, 1955, in Hamilton, Ohio and graduated from New Miami High School in 1974. She graduated from Miami University of Ohio in nursing (1976) and Concordia University, Nebraska in health care administration (2000).  She worked in many different nursing occupations and is a certified occupational hearing conservationist and health nurse specialist, and has won many nursing awards.

Combs was elected in 2002 to represent the 32nd Nebraska legislative district in the Nebraska Legislature, where she served one term, ending in 2007.

References
 

1955 births
Concordia University Nebraska alumni
Living people
People from Fillmore County, Nebraska
Republican Party Nebraska state senators
Miami University alumni
Women state legislators in Nebraska
21st-century American women